The following are fictional characters from Disney's 2000 animated film The Emperor's New Groove, its direct-to-video sequel Kronk's New Groove, and the spin-off television series The Emperor's New School.

Kuzco

Emperor Kuzco is the 18-year-old emperor of the Incas. His name is a reference to the ancient Incan city of Cusco.

Kuzco is initially portrayed as an arrogant, callous and spoiled narcissist, but has a sense of charm and style. For example, when he is shown beautiful girls in hopes one of them will be his wife, he rudely insults all of them and continues to sing about himself and be pampered by his servants. Throughout the series, he turns into various animals.

In The Emperor's New Groove, Kuzco is turned into a llama by the duplicitous Yzma, who intends to poison him to claim the throne for herself, following her termination as his adviser. He is presumed dead, and finds himself lost in the jungle. Kuzco teams up with Pacha, a llama herder, who helps Kuzco turn back into a human again, regaining his dignity and his throne. Throughout the film, Kuzco learns the meaning of friendship and sacrifice.

In Kronk's New Groove, Kuzco has a cameo appearance. He occasionally shows up onscreen acting as if he is the director and breaks the fourth wall by talking to the audience. He admits he has changed: 'I'm nice now. Didn't you see the first movie?' However, he remains arrogant; near the end of the film, he shows up in women's clothing, claiming he is Kronk's wife, announcing, 'You like how I weaseled my way into this movie?'

In The Emperor's New School, to remain emperor, Kuzco must to go to Kuzco Academy, a school he instituted and financed; he must pass all his classes, but Yzma and Kronk are out to thwart him. If he fails even one class, he will not be emperor, and Yzma will take over the empire. In the series, Kuzco develops a love interest named Malina.

In the episode "Father O Mine", Kuzco's real father appears in a flashback. He is a strong, muscular man, and was emperor before Kuzco. According to Kuzco and Yzma, he was lost at sea on a trip when Kuzco was just a baby, thereby granting the throne to Kuzco, who in turn is shown to share two things with his father: a llama birthmark and the same necklace. In another episode, it is revealed that Kuzco has a fear of frogs, after a traumatic childhood experience with them as a baby. In another, it is discovered that Kuzco's favorite food is Mudka's Meat Mug which is the only thing he orders. In "Graduation Groove", Kuzco completed school and got to be emperor again; having grown attached to Pacha's family, he lets them move into the palace with him, and hires both Pacha and Kronk to be his advisors. Kuzco and Malina also become an official couple and are happy to spend the rest of their lives together.

Kuzco rarely appears at the Disney Parks mainly due to the film’s disappointing box office results. He is mostly found in Adventureland. He also featured in the television series House of Mouse and its direct-to-video film Mickey's Magical Christmas.

Pacha

Pacha is an overweight farmer residing in the countryside of the Incas. He was a character added during the production process that completely revamped the story.  The original role to assist emperor-turned-llama Kuzco was to be female, and a potential love interest for the discourteous teen.  The major overhaul of story made the film a buddy movie, with Pacha and Kuzco having to work through the adventure together. His name is possibly a reference to Incan emperor Pachacuti but it also means "earth" in Quechua, the language of the Incas.

Pacha is a friendly peasant and family man, and a subject in the narrow-minded Emperor Kuzco's kingdom. His courage, reliability, and value of both friendship and family helps Kuzco change into a genial and mature young man. Pacha is married to Chicha, who is pregnant with Yupi when first seen. During the time of the first movie they have two children: their daughter, Chaca, and their younger son Tipo. Yupi is born before the movie's final scene and appears in all spin-off material.

In The Emperor's New Groove, Pacha is summoned to the palace by Kuzco and is told that his house on the hill will be destroyed to make room for Kuzco's summer home. Incredulous and furious that the emperor could be so selfish, he travels home to tell Chicha and his two children (Chaca and Tipo) that they have to leave their ancestral home. However, before he can tell them, he discovers that Kuzco has been transformed into a llama and dropped in the back of his cart. He is initially reluctant to help Kuzco, since the emperor seems to make it clear that he still intends to destroy Pacha's village. Over time, however, Pacha gradually helps Kuzco to start thinking of people other than himself, and he eventually sees the error of his ways. The two set out to turn Kuzco back to a human by getting to Yzma's lab. Upon returning to being human, Kuzco lets Pacha keep his village and even spends his summer vacation with Pacha's family.

Pacha has a supporting role in Kronk's New Groove, the movie that revolves around Kronk, Pacha is one of Kronk's friends. In one scene he disguises himself as "Pachita", Kronk's mother-in-law. He was once again voiced by Goodman.

In The Emperor's New School, he continues his father figure role to Kuzco and lets the young emperor-to-be live with him and his family while Kuzco goes to school. He always gives Kuzco advice to help him out of any situation. For example, when Kuzco was transformed into a rabbit, he told Kuzco to "Make the best of what you've got," which in this case was speed. As a result of the events of the original film, Kuzco and Pacha share an attachment as both friends and surrogate father and son.

In the show's first season, Fred Tatasciore took over the role, with Goodman later returning in the second season.

Yzma

Yzma is Kuzco's primary parental guardian and advisor, and the main antagonist of the franchise. In the English version, she was voiced by Eartha Kitt, who received three Annie Awards and two Emmy Awards for the role. Yzma is a foil to Kuzco in almost every way: he dresses in red and gold (as he is the Emperor) while she dresses in purple and other dark colors; while Kuzco is only bratty and spoiled, Yzma is conniving and power-hungry and continues to pursue her vengeance against Kuzco while he becomes a wiser ruler.

Yzma's character in the series is seen to be cruel, but comically eccentric, often calling herself beautiful even though all other characters in the series consider her appearance "scary beyond all reason". She is intelligent and comes up with grandiose plans and schemes with a set objective in mind, but fails to pay attention to the minor details of it. More often than not, such neglect causes the scheme to backfire on her. Yzma is seen to possess vast knowledge in alchemy, as she accidentally uses extract of llama on Kuzco, thinking that it was poison. In the first film, Kronk states that she should re-label her potions, because everything she makes in her "secret lab" has exactly the same pinkish color. It is implied that Yzma practices magic, but this is never shown. She is portrayed as more of a mad scientist, though she claims to be a sorceress.

Originally serving as the Emperor Kuzco's advisor, she is later fired after meddling in his affairs and attempting to act as Empress in his absence. Furious at her termination, Yzma conspires with her assistant Kronk to assassinate Kuzco. The two head to the "secret lab"—which apparently everybody already knows about—to concoct a plan to harm Kuzco. The film producers have stated that she is a complicated thinker; an example given with her original plan to kill Emperor Kuzco. The plan involved her turning him into a flea, putting him in a box, putting that box into another box and then mailing that box to herself only to smash it with a hammer. But after thinking it over (and partially because she knocked over some poison onto a plant), she decides to save on postage and simply poison him. The concept of her formulating a nonsensical plan before settling on an easier-to-pull-off idea (always a potion) would later be used as a running gag on the series.

Yzma reappears in the direct-to-DVD sequel Kronk's New Groove. During the first half of the film, she pretends to have been reformed and manipulates Kronk into helping her sell "youth potions" to the old people, but the potion is really a placebo. Once Kronk finds out her potion is a fake, the old people chase her down, where she uses a potion to transform herself into a rabbit, to prevent them from attacking her. She is then immediately carried off by a large bird of prey. At the end of the movie, in a nest outside the restaurant, Yzma (still in rabbit form) witnesses the bird's chicks hatch but they immediately reveal themselves to be viciously carnivorous and prepare to attack Yzma, who screams for dear life. Her appearance in the television series implies that she survived this situation.

In The Emperor's New School, Yzma is once again the main antagonist, who constantly plots to get Kuzco to fail his classes at Kuzco Academy, allowing her to become empress; to this end, she poses as Amzy (her first name spelled backwards), the principal of Kuzco Academy. Kronk is constantly fooled by her disguise, but Kuzco knows it's her. Her plans mainly consist of transforming Kuzco into different animals to foil his attempts to pass a class, though they often work to his advantage. In the episode "Monster Masquerade", Yzma takes a cobra form similar to Jafar's from the Disney film Aladdin. In “Graduation Groove”, the series finale, Yzma is demoted to Kronk's secretary for firing him earlier in the episode.

Yzma shares many of Kuzco's negative traits, including arrogance, unreliability and narcissism. Some of Yzma's known relatives appear at times in the series. They include her twin nephews, Zim and Zam (voiced by Dylan and Cole Sprouse), who appear in "Chipmunky Business", and her mother Azma, (voiced by Ellen Albertini Dow) who appears in "The Bride of Kuzco" and appears just as frail as Yzma (possibly even more so) and converses by sighs and coughs. In one episode, Yzma remarks that her plots to destroy Kuzco are primarily due to her mother constantly nagging her. A running gag throughout the show is that Yzma is often referred to as, and mistaken for, a dinosaur (a reference to the first movie, in which Kuzco states that she is "living proof that dinosaurs once roamed the Earth"). In one episode, he also calls her a wrinklesaurus and an old dinosaur.

In the television series House of Mouse, Yzma makes a brief cameo appearance in the episode "Pluto vs. Figaro".

Yzma was one of the villains in the show Villains Tonight! for Disney Cruise Line's Disney Magic and Disney Dream.

In the Descendants franchise, she has a daughter named Yzla who appears in the Isle of the Lost novel series. In the animated short series Descendants: Wicked World, she has a son named Zevon (voiced by Bradley Steven Perry), who acts as the main antagonist in the series' second season.

Kronk

Kronk Pepikrankenitz is the muscular and slow-witted henchman of Yzma, the royal adviser to Emperor Kuzco from The Emperor's New Groove. He also starred in his own film, Kronk's New Groove, and is a recurring character in the television series The Emperor's New School.  Kronk is the most recurring of all recurring characters in the franchise, serving as the franchise's comic relief (even breaking the fourth wall now and then); and in all of his appearances, he is voiced by Patrick Warburton, being one of the few voice actors in the franchise never to be replaced.

Despite working for the villain Yzma, he is surprisingly courteous and patient. Whenever he faces a moral dilemma, smaller versions of Kronk, his shoulder angel and devil, appear, but they usually bicker and mock one another instead of helping Kronk with the problem at hand.

He is revealed to be a great cook, who can make such things as spinach puffs and fondue, and also has a secret recipe for foie gras. He also knows a variety of recipes and kitchen slang, as revealed in first film when he takes over for the chef. He is capable of incredible superhuman athletics, such as running from a school to his house and back in mere seconds, and climbing a mountain (while having a seat tied to his body with Yzma riding atop). Through the animated series, it is learned that Kronk comes from a family of athletic health and fitness advocates. It was revealed in The Emperor's New School episode "Oops, All Doodles" that Kronk has a talent for drawing. In addition, Kronk is implied to be Jewish; in the film Kronk's New Groove, he fantasizes about marrying Miss Birdwell in a Jewish ceremony, complete with him stepping on a glass.

In The Emperor's New Groove, Kronk is Yzma's henchman, and is involved in her plot to kill Kuzco. Unfortunately, thanks to Kronk's potion mix-up, Kuzco instead turns into a llama. Kronk almost throws Kuzco over a waterfall, but has a change of heart and drops him on Pacha's cart instead. When he reveals his failure, Kronk then helps Yzma find him. He is shown as a sympathetic character through Yzma's mistreatment of him and his ability to 'speak Squirrel'.

Kronk later stars in the spin-off-ish sequel, starting as head chef and owner of a restaurant called Mudka's. He is happy with his new position, rather than his position with Yzma. However, Yzma eventually tricks him into helping her with a fake 'youth potion' to con money out of elderly villagers. He develops a love interest, named Birdwell, and his father, Papi (voiced by John Mahoney), is introduced.

In the animated television series, Kronk plays the role of hero, villain, sidekick of (n)either side, or a combination of these roles in varying episodes. He is Yzma's henchman and also Kuzco's classmate and close friend. Though he frequently helps Yzma with her schemes, he just as often helps Kuzco out of them. As a running gag, he can never remember that Principal Amzy is really Yzma, and as a result, thinks he is in trouble when Yzma calls for him. (In the last episode, he tells Yzma how obvious her disguise is, but when asked how long he has known, he replies 'About three episodes back.') Another running gag revolves around Kronk attempting to activate access to the secret lab, as originated from the original film with the secret lab's access procedure: more often than not, he constantly pulls the wrong one, and as a result, Yzma constantly gets booby-trapped before fixing the error. In a rather fitting irony of the series' outcome, Kuzco appoints Kronk as his new advisor (since he sometimes gives thoughtful, eloquent advice), while Yzma is made Kronk's assistant.

Other characters introduced in the films 
Intorduced in The Emperor's New Groove
Pacha's family, which includes:
Chicha (voiced by Wendie Malick) is Pacha's protective and caring wife. Throughout most of the first film, she is heavily pregnant with her third child, Yupi, who is born before the final scene.
Chaca and Tipo (voiced by Kellyann Elso and Eli Russel Linnettz, and Jessie Flower and Shane Baumel in later appearances) are Pacha and Chicha's children, who constantly try to one-up each other and compete for their father's attentions. Chaca is a little 7-year-old girl who has pigtails and wears a yellow shawl and a red skirt with her belly button showing. Her name is not mentioned in the first film but is revealed in the rest of the franchise. Her younger brother Tipo is a 6-year-old boy who is quite chubby and wears a green waistcloth while leaving his belly exposed. In their first film, he has a nightmare about Kuzco and Pacha tied to the log in a vine, and later, he and Chaca help their mother keep Yzma occupied while Kuzco and Pacha make for the palace. In Kronk's New Groove, they join Kronk's Junior Chipmunks at Camp Chippamunka.
Yupi is Pacha and Chicha's baby. He is born before at the end of the first film. In Kronk's New Groove, when Chaca introduces him to Papi he mentions for the first time his name and current age, mentioning that he is only half a year old.
Matta (voiced by Patti Deutsch) is the waitress at Mudka's Meat Hut. In The Emperor's New Groove, she seves Pacha and Kuzco their food at the restaurant. In the sequel, Kronk tells her how he lost the house and the possibility of having a wife that he promised his father. In The Emperor's New School, she is Kuzco Academy's lunch lady. Matta likes to cook weird stuff such as octopus burgers and speaks in cafeteria speech when she talks.
Rudy (voiced by John Fiedler and currently by Travis Oates) is an old man who first appears accidentally interrupting Kuzco's "groove", for which he is thrown out a window. He warns Pacha about this, and Kuzco apologizes to him at the end of the film, which he accepts with good grace. In Kronk's New Groove, Rudy and his friends from the old folks' home are tricked by Yzma, who sells them sewer slime as a youth potion. They have to sell their home to pay for it, but Kronk gives them their home back. In The Emperor's New School, Rudy appeared in "Girls Behaving Oddly", "The Astonishing-Kuzco Man" and made a few cameo appearances  in "Overachiever's Club" and "Kuzcokazooza". In the series, he works as janitor at the Kuzco Academy.
Bucky (voiced by Bob Bergen in all of his appearances) is a squirrel whom Kuzco first encounters; after Kuzco is rude to him, Bucky attempts to wake the black jaguars by popping a balloon llama, but when he fails, Kuzco accidentally wakes them himself. Bucky later tells Kronk and Yzma which way Kuzco went, and appears in the final scene as Kronk's helper in teaching squirrel talking. Bucky makes various appearances in The Emperor's New School. He was Kuzco's tutor in the episode "Squeakend at Bucky's".
Topo and Ipi (voiced by Jeff Bennett) are two old men with a minor appearance in The Emperor's New Groove playing checkers and greeting Pacha when he returns to his village. They have a more relevant role in Kronk's New Groove, as part of the residents from the old folks' home who are tricked by Yzma. Latter they help Kronk when his father appears, dressed as babies and saying that they are Kronk's children. They are recurring characters in The Emperor's New School, playing checkers, and where Topo always makes jokes. In episode "Clash of the Families", it is possible that Topo is Kavo's grandfather according to Clash of the Families tug-o-warring in Kuzco's slideshow of his memory from the Familyimpics before. Both receive their names in the series, Ipi's name not being mentioned in the films, while Topo is called "Burt" by Kronk in Kronk's New Groove (in said film they being credited simply as "Stout Old Man" and "Skinny Old Man").
The Royal Recordkeeper (voiced by Joe Whyte in The Emperor's New Groove, and Rip Taylor in The Emperor's New School) appear in The Emperor's New Groove as the one in charge of finding a bride for Kuzco. In The Emperor's New School he appears as a recurring character, reminding Kuzco of the rules in order to become emperor. The character also appears in the House of Mouse episode "Pluto vs. Figaro" in a brief cameo appearance.
Delivery Man makes his original appearance in The Emperor's New Groove delivering a giant trampoline that coincidentally enough saves a falling Yzma. In The Emperor's New School he appears in a recurring gag making wrong deliveries in various episodes. His voice actors include Jeff Bennett, Brian Cummings, and Fred Tatasciore.
The Bug and the Monkey appear briefly in The Emperor's New Groove, at one point showing a wide view of the waterfall Kuzco was going to fall from before being caught by Kronk, showing the bug on a branch, and at that moment the monkey appears, who eats the bug. Similar scenes with them appear as a recurring gag in The Emperor's New School.

Intorduced in Kronk's New Groove
Miss Birdwell (voiced by Tracey Ullman) is Kronk's love interest in Kronk's New Groove. Like Kronk, Birdwell is a camp counselor. When Tipo pulls a prank to win the camp championships and is caught, Kronk protects the boy at the cost of alienating his love. However, at the end of the film, Tipo reunites them and Kronk wins Birdwell's love. In the credits, it is hinted that the two got married.
Papi (voiced by John Mahoney and Jeff Bennett) is Kronk's father. Though he has few appearances in Kronk's New Groove, he is instrumental to the plot of the film as Kronk is always trying to get Papi's approval. In The Emperor's New School, he appeared in "Clash of the Families" and "Kronkenitza".
Hildy (voiced by April Winchell) is an old woman, part of the residents from the old folks' home, friends of Kronk. In the climax of the film she poses as Kronk's daughter.
Marge and Tina (voiced by April Winchell) are the two secretaries hired by Kronk when he makes a fortune, until they sadly say goodbye to him, but telling him not to worry about them since they have been contacted by a team of headhunters. At the climax of the film they return to pose as Kronk's wives.

Introduced in The Emperor's New School

Malina

Malina is the only major character from the series that has not previously appeared in either The Emperor's New Groove or Kronk's New Groove. She is Kuzco's best friend and love interest. He has an intense crush on her (he often calls her "a hottie hot hottie" or "the hottiest hot hottie in hottie-ville").

Malina is a cheerleader and the school council president who also is very diligent. She prints the Academy's news scroll. She is a straight-A+ student, which is a requirement for the cheerleading squad. She is driven to excel almost to the point of having a nervous breakdown if she does not do everything to her ability, and has a very moral mindset which the show uses as a foil against Kuzco's immature approach.

Malina also has an incredibly strong sense of winning every contest she enters by any means, which first appeared in the episode "The Emperor's New Tuber" in which Malina was determined to fill all the spots on the Whack-A-Weasel arcade game on the high score board with her name (the last person on the list was Yzma). Also, both her devil and angel sides encouraged her to cheat in the potato growing contest despite her angel side was supposed to "tell her not to do it", in which she responded that she was not about to lose her perfect record.

In the second season, Malina shows that she is not as perfect as most people think. For example, she is sometimes bigoted, and shows greed, mentioned by Kuzco in the episode "Gold Fool's". Malina is also quite serious and has an intimidating face referred to as 'The Stare' by Kuzco and Kronk. In "Oops, All Doodles", it is revealed that Malina's doodles are drawn in a Chibi anime-style. Malina is also set with a challenge before her: get Kuzco to do the right thing. She tries to reason with him about lying, being entitled, not caring about others and conspiracy theories that make no sense. Malina mentors Kuzco because she wants to help him graduate and learn how to become a better person.

Malina is the voice of reason to Kuzco. She always has to show Kuzco the correct decision to take. Malina seems to know what Kuzco is thinking, as she has commented on what he was saying in his head multiple times. She is incredibly observant, as she is instantly and accurately able to figure out many of Kuzco's mistakes despite not witnessing them herself. As shown in the episode "The Mystery of Machu Picchu", she has a pink rabbit stuffed animal, named Floopy, similar to Kuzco's 'Wompy.'

In the final episode of the series, she goes on a date with Kuzco straight after he is made emperor and happily becomes his girlfriend.

Recurring and minor characters
The following is a list of recurring and minor characters from The Emperor's New School.

References

characters
Fictional indigenous people of the Americas
Fictional South American people
Lists of Disney animated film characters
Lists of characters in American television animation
The Emperor's New Groove
The Emperor's New School